Madison Avenue Presbyterian Church is a member church of the Presbyterian Church (USA), located at 73rd Street and Madison Avenue on the Upper East Side of New York City.

In 1927 George Arthur Buttrick succeeded Henry Sloane Coffin as minister.

References

Churches in Manhattan
Upper East Side
Presbyterian churches in New York City
Presbyterian Church (USA) churches